Tysk Pass is a mountain pass between Hogskavlen Mountain and Domen Butte in the Borg Massif, Queen Maud Land. The feature was first photographed from the air by the German Antarctic Expedition (1938–39). It was mapped by Norwegian cartographers from surveys and air photos by Norwegian-British-Swedish Antarctic Expedition (NBSAE) (1949–52) and named Tyskepasset (the German pass), presumedly because it was seen earlier by the German expedition.

Mountain passes of Queen Maud Land
Princess Martha Coast